The Sidi El Barrak Dam is an embankment dam centred  northeast of Tabarak and  from the Mediterranean Sea on the Oued Zouara River in the Beja Governorate, Tunisia. Constructed between 1994 and 2000, the primary purpose of the dam is water supply. As part of the Sidi el Barrak Development Project water stored in the dam is pumped to the Seyjame Dam, at a rate of  annually. This water is supplied to Tunis, Cap Bon and the Sahel including Sfax for municipal use along with other agricultural purposes. The entire project was completed in 2002.

References

Dams in Tunisia
Embankment dams
Dams completed in 2000
Ramsar sites in Tunisia
2000 establishments in Tunisia